John Langeloth Loeb Jr. CBE (born May 2, 1930)  is an American businessman, former United States Ambassador to Denmark, and former Delegate to the United Nations. He is an advocate for religious freedom and separation of church and state, having founded the George Washington Institute for Religious Freedom in 2009. Loeb continues to serve as chairman of the George Washington Institute.

Early life and education
John Langeloth Loeb, Jr. was born on May 2, 1930 in New York City. His parents were businessman John Langeloth Loeb Sr. (1902–1996) and Frances Lehman (1906–1996). Loeb's father and his paternal grandfather, Carl M. Loeb (1875–1955), were founders of Loeb, Rhoades & Co. Loeb's mother was a granddaughter of Mayer Lehman (1830–1897), one of the three founders of Lehman Brothers. Loeb is the grandson of Arthur Lehman (Senior Partner at Lehman Brothers and founding president of Lehman Brothers) and Adele Lewisohn Lehman. He is a great-grandson of Adolph Lewisohn and grand-nephew of former New York Governor and U. S. Senator Herbert H. Lehman. His father is of Jewish background.

Loeb and his father share the middle name Langeloth in honor of family friend and businessman John Jacob Langeloth (1852–1914). Loeb received his M.B.A. in 1954 from Harvard Business School.

Government and public affairs
On July 30, 1981, President Ronald Reagan appointed Loeb to the post of United States Ambassador to Denmark. He served in this post until September 1983. Upon his return to the United States, he was appointed a delegate to the 38th session of United Nations. He also served as special advisor to Governor Nelson A. Rockefeller on environmental matters (1967–1973) and chairman of New York State Council of Environmental Advisors (1970–1975).

Loeb was Chairman of the Keep New York State Clean Program (1971-1975). He was a delegate to the Republican National Convention in 1992 and an alternate delegate to the Republican National Conventions in 1988 and 1992.

Organization memberships
Loeb is one out of a group of one-hundred trustees who work for the American-Scandinavian Foundation. Loeb is chairman of the board of trustees of the Winston Churchill Foundation of the United States (see Churchill Scholarship). Loeb serves on the board of advisors of the Department of Ophthalmology at Columbia University Medical Center. From 1966 to 1994 Loeb served on the board of trustees of the Museum of the City of New York.

George Washington Institute for Religious Freedom
Loeb founded the George Washington Institute for Religious Freedom (GWIRF) in 2009 with the goal of raising people' awareness about the roots of religious freedom and the separation of church and state in the United States and the importance of these principles. Loeb serves as GWIRF's chairman.

Loeb Institute 
In 2016, Loeb, through the John L. Loeb Jr. Foundation and the George Washington Institute for Religious Freedom, donated $2.5 million to establish the John L. Loeb Jr. Institute for Religious Freedom at George Washington University. The institute operates within the Columbian College of Arts and Sciences.

Awards and honors
On May 7, 1969, Loeb was made a Churchill Fellow of Westminster College in Fulton, MO, site of Winston Churchill's famous Iron Curtain speech.

Upon leaving his ambassadorial post in 1983, Margrethe II of Denmark awarded him the Grand Cross of the Order of the Dannebrog. She also bestowed a Danish crest and coat-of-arms.

In 1992, Elizabeth II created him a Commander of the British Empire.

In 2010, he was invited to deliver the Herbert H. Lehman Memorial Lecture at Lehman College CUNY. He also has an honorary Doctor of Laws degree from Georgetown University Law School (1980) and was Person of the Year in 2005 at the Danish American Society.

Personal life
Loeb has been married three times. In 1960, he married his first wife, Nina Sundby, with whom he has a daughter. His second wife was Meta Martindell Harrsen with whom he has a son, Nicholas Mears Loeb. In 2012, Loeb married his third wife, Sharon J. Handler.

Loeb financed the creation of the Loeb Visitors Center at the Touro Synagogue National Historic Site in Newport, Rhode Island.

References

External links
 George Washington Institute for Religious Freedom

1930 births
Ambassadors of the United States to Denmark
Jewish American philanthropists
Florida Republicans
Harvard Business School alumni
Hotchkiss School alumni
Lehman family
Living people
Carl M. Loeb family
Harvard College alumni
Commanders of the Order of the British Empire